Gazoryctra confusus is a moth of the family Hepialidae. It is known from the United States.

References

Moths described in 1885
Hepialidae
Moths of North America